The Bhavsar is a caste found in the Indian states of Gujarat, Maharashtra, Karnataka , Madhya Pradesh, Telangana, Andhra Pradesh, Tamil Nadu and Rajasthan. Their traditional occupation is mainly in business involved in cloth merchant,textile.  Early 1850s Bhavsars earn their riches through clothing business, farmlands, havelis, horses but most Bhavsars are now pursuing modern day occupations, including private sector or public sector jobs. After Independence of India Bhavsars did not get much generous govt grants or opportunities. Bhavsars are being considered in open category. With no alternate (including Govt grants and benefit after independence) youth going towards higher education including engineering, medical, business degree and others.

History
According to legend, the Bhavsar originated in the Saurashtra region, which is now in the state of Gujarat.

The Bhavsar community has negotiated with the Pakistani government to assure passage for regular pilgrimages to Hinglaj. Hinglaj Mata is their Community deity.

Language
The Bhavsar community in Gujarat speak Gujarati and in those Rajasthan speaks a Rajasthani dialect,  and the rest speak Marathi, apart from the local language but the Gujarati speaking and Marathi speaking Bhavsars were traditionally endogamous.

See also
Pujya Mota
Cloth merchant

References

External links
 http://www.bhavsarsamaj.com/index.php

Further reading
Advanced communities among the Kshatriyas of Malwa and Western India – Shankar Patwardhan, Arvind Vyas Paper no. AS056/2007 submitted to Anthropological Survey of India

Indian castes
Social groups of Gujarat
Social groups of Maharashtra
Social groups of Rajasthan